Rajanala Kaleswara Rao, known mononymously by his surname as Rajanala, was an Indian actor known for his works predominantly in Telugu cinema, Telugu theatre, and a few Tamil, Kannada, and Hindi films. In a film career spanning more than four decades, Rajanala acted in more than 1400 feature films in a variety of characters. Regarded as one of the finest method actors, Rajanala was known for his gruesome portrayals of lead antagonist roles during the Golden age of Telugu cinema. The Government of Andhra Pradesh and the film industry felicitated him for his achievements and contribution to Indian Film Industry. He won several Filmfare Awards South and Nandi Award.

Early life and characteristics
Rajanala was born on January 3, 1925, in Nellore, Andhra Pradesh, India. While working as a revenue inspector in Nellore from 1944 to 1951 he made his entry into theatre. A post graduate in philosophy from University of Lucknow and a voracious reader of English literature. Before coming to Cinema, he won several awards and accolades for his acting in Theatre. He was a noted villain against N.T.Rama Rao, a versatile actor of Telugu filmdom at that time. Rajanala had well proportioned body, he also won MR. Madras for his Physique. Rajanala iconic acting was mostly through the movement of his eyes, he evince the cruelty by widening his eyes to various levels and his maniacal laughter was very famous. Rajanala played many villainous roles, but in real life he was an intellectual and spiritual man. Rajanala Kaleswara Rao, the first actor to star alongside three chief ministers, i.e. NT Rama Rao, M. G. Ramachandran and J Jayalalithaa, he also had good friends in other film industry Kollywood and Bollywood.

Death
Being a diabetic, his right leg could not withstand the rigours of outdoor shooting in Araku valley in 1995 when he was playing a full-fledged role in Telugu Veera Levara. His leg which was injured during the shooting had to be amputated at Nizams Institute of Medical Sciences. Later Rajanala shifted to Chennai taken cared by his daughter and son-in-law who was a businessman. Rajanala had severe cardiac arrest and was admitted in Vijaya Hospital in Chennai. He died on 21 May 1998 in Chennai, aged 73.

Filmography

Pratigya (1953)
 Vaddante Dabbu (1954)
Jayasimha (1955)
Suvarna Sundari (1957)
Dongallo Dora (1957)
Kutumba Gowravam (1957)
Vinayaka Chaviti (1957)
Vaddante Pelli (1957) as Raghunath
Sati Anasuya (1957)
Raja Nandini (1958) as Tirumala Nayak
Sri Krishna Maya (1958)
Karthavarayuni Katha (1958)
Dongalunnaru Jagratha (1958)
Manchi Manasuku Manchi Rojulu (1958)
Pelli Sandadi (1959)
Raja Malaya Simha (1959)
Raja Makutam (1959)
Banda Ramudu (1959)
Rechukka Pagatichukka (1959)
Vachina Kodalu Nachindi (1959)
Sri Venkateswara Mahatyam (1960)
Runanubandham (1960)
Anna Chellelu (1960) as Aggi Pidugu Jaggadu
Sahasra Siracheda Apoorva Chinthamani (1960)
Vimala (1960)
 Kanaka Durga Pooja Mahima (1960)
Pillalu Techina Challani Rajyam (1960)
Usha Parinayam (1961)
Jagadeka Veeruni Katha (1961)
Taxi Ramudu (1961)
Khaidi Kannaiah (1962)
Siri Sampadalu (1962)
Gulebakavali Katha (1962)
Gaali Medalu (1962)
Chitti Tammudu (1962)
Dakshayagnam (1962)
Gundamma Katha (1962)
Swarna Manjari (1962)
Madana Kamaraju Katha (1962)
Paruvu Prathishta (1963)
Bandipotu (1963) as Soorasimha
Valmiki (1963)
Narthanasala (1963)
Guruvunu Minchina Sishyudu (1963)
Ramudu Bheemudu (1964)
Vaarasatwam (1964)
Devatha (1964)
Sabhash Suri (1964)
Thotalo Pilla Kotalo Rani (1964)
Desa Drohulu (1964)
Aggi Pidugu (1964)
Bobbili Yudham (1964)
 Pratigna Palana (1965)
Pandava Vanavasam (1965)
Mangamma Sapadham (1965)
C.I.D. (1965)
Sri Simhachala Kshetra Mahima (1965)
 Vijaya Simha (1965)
Dorikithe Dongalu (1965)
Satya Harishchandra (1965)
Jwala Dweepa Rahasyam (1965)
Veerabhimanyu (1965)
Aada Brathuku (1965)
Sri Krishna Pandaviyam (1966)
Pidugu Ramudu (1966)
Palnati Yudham (1966)
Goodachari 116 (1966)
Sri Krishna Tulabharam (1966)
Aame Evaru? (1966)
Gopaludu Bhoopaludu (1967)
Kanchu Kota (1967)
Bhama Vijayam (1967)
Nindu Manasulu (1967)
Sri Sri Sri Maryada Ramanna (1967)
Sri Krishnavataram (1967)
Ave Kallu (1967)
Farz (1967)
Apoorva Piravaigal (1967)
Rahasyam (1967)
Niluvu Dopidi (1968)
 Aggi Meeda Guggilam (1968)
 Devudicchina Bharta (1968)
Bandhavyalu (1968)
Tikka Sankaraiah (1968)
Nene Monaganni (1968)
Deva kanya (1968)
Baghdad Gajadonga (1968)
Ramu (1968)
Bhagya Chakramu (1968)
Pedarasi Peddamma Katha (1968)
 Jarigina Katha (1969)
Varakatnam (1969)
 Raja Simha (1969)
 Gandara Gandadu (1969)
Gandikota Rahasyam (1969)
Mooga Nomu (1969)
Bhale Tammudu (1969)
Saptaswaralu (1969)
Takkari Donga Chakkani Chukka (1969)
Basti Kiladilu (1970)
Ananda Nilayam (1971)
Sri Krishna Vijayamu (1971)
Raitu Bidda (1971)
Pagabattina Paduchu (1971)
Sati Anasuya (1971)
Kathiki Kankanam (1971)
Suputhrudu (1971)
Mattilo Manikyam (1971)
Pavitra Hrudayalu (1971)
Chinnanati Snehitulu (1971)
Debbaku tha Dongala Mutha (1971) as Phool Shah
Sri Krishnanjaneya Yuddham (1972) as Anjaneya
Attanu Diddina Kodalu (1972) as Jagapati
Sri Krishna Satya (1972)
Inspector Bharya (1972)
Desoddharakulu (1973) as Tata Rao
Doctor Babu (1973)
Jeevana Tarangalu (1973)
Alluri Seetarama Raju (1974)
Nippulanti Manishi (1974)
Galipatalu (1974)
Kotha Kapuram (1975)
Annadammula Anubandham (1975)
Magaadu (1976)
Maa Daivam (1976)
Aradhana (1976)
Muthyala Pallaki (1976) as Meesala Rosi Reddy
Daana Veera Soora Karna (1977) as Drona
Chanakya Chandragupta (1977)
 Agent Gopi (1978)
Yuga Purushudu (1978)
Dudu Basavanna (1978) as Bangaraiah
Lawyer Viswanath (1978)
Rajaputra Rahasyam (1978)
Devadasu Malli Puttadu (1978)
 Dongalaku Saval (1979)
 Gandharva Kanya (1979)
Sri Madvirata Parvam (1979) as Drona
Nakili Manishi (1980)
Sivamettina Satyam (1980)
Kiladi Krishnudu (1980) as Manager
Mama Allulla Saval (1980) as Judge
Pagabattina Simham (1982) as Ramapuram Zamindar
Bobbili Puli (1982)
Nijam Chepithe Nerama (1983) as Govt. Official
Chattaniki Veyi Kallu (1983)
Bhale Thammudu (1985)
Surya Chandra (1985)
Number One (1994)
Hello Brother (1994)
Jailor Gaari Abbayi (1994)
 Telugu Veera Levara (1995)

Gallery

References

Telugu male actors
Date of death missing
1925 births
1998 deaths
People from Nellore
Indian male stage actors
20th-century Indian male actors
Andhra University alumni
Indian male film actors
Telugu film producers
Male actors in Telugu cinema
Male actors from Andhra Pradesh
Male actors in Tamil cinema
Recipients of the Rashtrapati Award
Nandi Award winners
Film producers from Andhra Pradesh
Indian male dramatists and playwrights
20th-century Indian dramatists and playwrights
20th-century Indian male writers